General elections were held in the Gambia on 11 March 1987. The election date had been announced on 1 January 1987 and nominations for presidential candidates closed on 9 February. A total of 113 candidates ran for the 36 elected seats. Both elections were won by the People's Progressive Party, whose leader Dawda Jawara remained president.

Results

President

Parliament

References

Gambia
Parliamentary elections in the Gambia
Election
Presidential elections in the Gambia
March 1987 events in Africa
Election and referendum articles with incomplete results